Angelokastro (Greek: Αγγελόκαστρο) is a village and a former municipality in Aetolia-Acarnania, West Greece, Greece. Since the 2011 local government reform it is part of the municipality Agrinio, of which it is a municipal unit. The municipal unit has an area of 55.726 km2.

References

Sources 

 
 

Populated places in Aetolia-Acarnania